CRMS may refer to:

 Colorado Rocky Mountain School, in Carbondale, Colorado, United States
 Contract risk management software
 Creighton Model FertilityCare System (CrMS), a birth-control method
 Customer relationship management systems

See also 
 CRM (disambiguation)